Robert Hanley "Bob" Willoughby (June 30, 1927 – 18 December 2009) was an American photographer. Popular Photography called him "The man who virtually invented the photojournalistic motion picture still."

Biography 
Willoughby was born in Los Angeles, California. He pursued photography after receiving a camera as a gift on his 12th birthday. Willoughby studied photography at the film school at the University of Southern California and worked under graphic designer Saul Bass at the Kahn Institute of Art.

Between 1948 and 1954, his exhibitions of photographs of jazz musicians and dancers led to a contract with Globe Photos, and one, of a screaming female audience,  was selected by Edward Steichen for The Family of Man exhibit at the Museum of Modern Art which toured the world to be seen by 9 million visitors. Later, he worked for Harper's Bazaar magazine where his photographs illustrated arts and culture articles.

His big break came when he was assigned by six magazines to photograph Judy Garland during the filming of A Star is Born (1954). Subsequently, he was hired by Warner Brothers to film the extensive "Born in a Trunk" sequence. This was the first time a motion picture studio hired a special or unit photographer to specifically take photographs for sale to magazines. The result was a Life magazine cover featuring a close-up portrait of the pixie-faced singer in costume. It was her second Life cover and his first.

Much of Willoughby's popularity stemmed from his ability to capture film stars in unguarded moments of repose and vulnerability. Director Sydney Pollack said in the introduction to Bob's autobiography: "Sometimes a filmmaker gets a look at a photograph taken on his own set and sees the 'soul' of his film in one still photograph. It's rare, but it happens. It happened to me in 1969, the first time I looked at the work of Bob Willoughby during the filming of They Shoot Horses, Don't They?".

In 1963, Willoughby built the first remote radio-controlled camera for on-set still photography. This led to other innovations that enabled him to take still photographs identical to the film footage.

Willoughby continued to photograph for the rest of his life. He lived in Ireland for 17 years where he used his photographic skills to illustrate ancient Irish poetry text with photographs of the countryside. In addition, he authored books on photography and other subjects. He lived his last years in Vence, France, where he continued a very active professional life. He died of cancer on 18 December 2009. Willoughby's images are represented by the Motion Picture and Television Photo Archive and can be viewed by the public at mptvimages.com

Body of Work 

His photographs are held in collections and exhibited worldwide including:

 Museum of Modern Art, New York
 The National Portrait Gallery, Washington, DC and London, England 
 The National Media Museum, Bradford, UK
 The Bibliothèque nationale de France in Paris, France
 Musee de la Photographie, Charleroi, Belgium

References

External links 
 Bob Willoughby - Gallery And Bio
 Bob Willoughby's website featuring a gallery and archival prints for collectors
  The Photographers Gallery-Bob Willoughby

1927 births
2009 deaths
20th-century American photographers
University of Southern California alumni
American expatriates in France
Artists from Los Angeles
Deaths from cancer in France
Jazz photographers
USC School of Cinematic Arts alumni